Franz Anton Aloys Pollender (26 January 1799 – 17 August 1879) was a German physician who is credited with the discovery of the etiology of anthrax.

1799 births
1879 deaths
19th-century German physicians